"Come Dance with Me" is a popular song and jazz standard written by 1959 by Jimmy Van Heusen (music) and Sammy Cahn (words) that debuted in 1959 as the title track on Frank Sinatra's album, Come Dance with Me!

History 
The song references Terpsichore –  one of the nine Greek Muses and the goddess of dance and chorus.  The lyrics also mention "Basie Boots," a reference to bandleader Count Basie.

Selected discography 
 1959: Frank Sinatra's album, Come Dance with Me!, featuring Billy May and His Orchestra, Capitol SW-1069 (audio via YouTube)
 1959: Oscar Peterson and His Trio on the album, A Jazz Portrait of Frank Sinatra, Verve MGV-8334 (audio via YouTube)
 1961: Peggy Lee - for her album Olé ala Lee
 1998: Barry Manilow, Manilow Sings Sinatra
 2006: Joey McIntyre's album, Talk to Me
 2006: Diana Krall's album, From This Moment On
 2008: Joey DeFrancesco trio (Jerry Weldon tenor sax), Joey D! (album) HighNote (audio via YouTube)
 2013: Michael Bublé's album, To Be Loved

References 

Songs with music by Jimmy Van Heusen
Songs with lyrics by Sammy Cahn
Frank Sinatra songs
1959 songs